Journey to the West is a Chinese television series adapted from the classic 16th-century novel of the same title. The series was first broadcast on CCTV in China on 1 October 1986. The series became an instant classic in China and was praised for being one of the most original and faithful interpretations. Unadapted portions of the original story were later covered in the second season, which was released in 1999. CCTV released the entire series online on YouTube and in addition has an edited version (all episodes are 45 minutes long) with English subtitles, making a total of 40 episodes instead of the original 41.

List of episodes

Season 1
Season 1 has 25 episodes and covers 74 chapters of the novel. The first trial episode was aired on 1 October 1986, and filming lasted until 1987. It was aired as a whole series in 1988. With the limited but relatively new special effects, the series received a viewership rate of 89.4% in 1987. The series has been rebroadcast every year since then. As of 2012, the series has been repeated on Chinese local channels more than 2,000 times.

Season 2
Season 2 has 16 episodes (covers another 25 chapters of the novel). Filming began in 1998 and finished in 1999. It was broadcast on CCTV in 2000. The internal story of the second season has the four protagonists relating to Emperor Taizong of Tang via flashbacks of their travels and adventures, (namely those episodes not depicted in the first series) upon their return to China. Season 2 differs from the format of the first season, as most episodes end on a cliffhanger, with conflicts being resolved and new ones encountered in the middle of episodes in a more fluid timeline.

Cast

Some of the actors played multiple roles while certain roles were played by multiple actors

Season 1

Main cast
Liu Xiao Ling Tong as Sun Wukong 
Wang Yue (episodes 6, 9, 10), Xu Shaohua (episodes 4, 5, 7, 8, 11, 12, 14-16), Chi Chongrui (episodes 13, 17-25) as Tang Sanzang 
Ma Dehua as Zhu Bajie 
Yan Huaili as Sha Wujing

Other cast
Listed in order of appearance

 Guan Yunjie as Puti Zhushi
 Xiang Han as Horse Monkey
 Ma Dehua as White Haired Monkey
 Xiong Ni as Monkey
 Zhang Yushan as Jade Emperor
 Yan Huaili as Thousand Li Eye
 Xiang Han as Wind Following Ear
 Li Yonggui as Old shopkeeper
 Li Lianyi as Official
 Wang Zhongxin as Taibai Jinxing
 Wang Yuli as Li Jing
 Xiang Han as Fishmonger
 Yan Huaili as Old man
 Bai Chunxiang as Servant boy
 Li Xijing as Dragon King of the East Sea
 Liu Jiang as King Yama
 Wang Zhishan as Wuqu Xingjun
 Lin Zhiqian as Demon King of Chaos
 Han Shanxu as Single Horned Devil King
 Yan Huaili, Wang Futang as Bull Demon King
 Qian Yongkang as Juling Shen
 Yan Huaili as Official
 Zhang Jidie as Official
 Xiang Han and Li Jiancheng as Black and White Guards of Impermanence
 Ai Jinmei, Yang Bin as Nezha
 Zheng Rong, Yan Huaili as Taishang Laojun
 Lin Zhiqian as Erlang Shen
 Zhu Bingqian as Taiyi Zhenren
 Zuo Dabin as Guanyin
 Guo Wei, Ren Fengpo as Lingji Bodhisattva
 Zhao Quan, Ye Yimeng as Manjusri
 Chi Zhaopeng, Guo Wei, Jin Genxu as Samantabhadra
 An Yunwu, Li Runsheng and Yang Yuzhang as Fu Lu Shou
 Wu Guiling as Immortal Zhenyuan
 Kong Rui, Xiang Han as Earth Deity
 Wang Xueqin, Zhang Yanyan as Seventh Fairy
 Zhang Jingdi as Immortal Crane
 Wan Fuxiang as Queen Mother of the West
 Han Shanxu, Jin Genxu as Barefoot Immortal
 Xu Qing as Red Dress Boy
 Xiang Han as Ananda
 Li Jiancheng as Mahākāśyapa
  Ma Ling as Dancing fairy
 Zhang Zhiming as Emperor Taizong of Tang
 Guo Jiaqing as Guanyin's incarnation
 Xu Shaohua as Chen Guangrui
 Ma Lan as Miss Yin
 Han Shanxu as Liu Hong
 Li Jiancheng as Teahouse keeper
 Zhu Longguang as Buddha
 Qiu Peining as Chang'e
 Wang Bozhao as White Dragon Horse
 Yan Huaili as Dragon King of the West Sea
 Li Longbin, Yu Weijie as Nine Headed Bug
 Han Shanxu as Old man
 He Yi as Boy
 Xu Chuan as Liu Boqin
 Xiang Han, Ma Dehua, Yang Bin, He Yi, Li Runsheng, Li Lianyi as robbers
 Cheng Zhi as Jinchi Elder
 Li Yonggui as Monk Guangzhi
 Xiang Han as Black Wind Demon
 Lin Zhiqian as Virapaksa
 Cheng Weibing as Lingxuzi
 Kong Rui as Squire Gao
 Gao Yuqian as Mrs Gao

 Wei Huili as Squire Gao's daughter
 Xiang Han as Gao Cai
 Zhang Jidie as Dibao
 Xiang Ling as Maid
 Sun Fengqin as Lishan Laomu
 Guo Jiaqing as Yellow Wind Demon
 Shen Huifen as Zhenzhen
 Yang Fengyi as Ai'ai
 He Jing as Lianlian
 Ren Fengpo as Lingji Bodhisattva
 Yang Bin as Muzha
 Xu Ye as Fairy
 Zhang Jidie as Tiger Vanguard
 Wang Yang as Qingfeng
 Cai Lin as Mingyue
 Yang Qingxia as White Bone Demoness
 Huang Fei as Old man
 Liu Huimin as Old woman
 Yang Jun as Village woman
 Li Hongchang as Black Fox Demon
 Li Lianyi as Skeleton Demon
 Ren Fengpo as Yellow Robe Demon
 Gu Lan as King of Baoxiang
 Liu Bing as Baihuaxiu
 Han Fengxia, Li Hongchang as Black Fox Demon
 Yang Shubiao as Yellow Robe Demon (transformation)
 Ren Wenjian as White Dragon Horse (transformation)
 Yang Shubiao as Wood Wolf of Legs
 Che Xiaotong as Golden Horned King
 Guo Shouyang as Silver Horned King
 Liu Xiao Ling Tong as Priest
 Li Jiancheng as Meticulous Devil
 Ji Fuji as Intelligent Bug
 Liu Xiao Ling Tong as Nine Tailed Vixen
 Ma Dehua as Mountain Deity
 Lei Ming as King of Wuji
 Xiang Mei as Queen of Wuji
 Wang Haining as Crown prince of Wuji
 Zhao Guangshan as Monk
 Chi Chongrui as Dragon King of the well
 Teng Teng as Servant boy
 Dong Honglin as Evil priest
 Li Jiancheng as Eunuch
 Zhao Xinpei as Red Boy
 Xiang Han and Xu Tinglei as Earth deities
 Li Jiancheng, Li Anjian, Zhang Ziyue as Mountain deities
 Xu Shaohua as Dragon King
 Zhao Yuxiu as King of Chechi
 Zhao Lirong as Queen of Chechi
 Liu Qin as Tiger Power Immortal
 Zeng Ge as Deer Power Immortal
 Cai Yuge as Antelope Power Immortal
 Jin Genxu and Xu Tinglei as Priests
 Liu Xiao Ling Tong as Yunshui Quanzhen
 Zhu Lin as Ruler of Women's Kingdom
 Yang Guixiang as Royal Adviser of Women's Kingdom
 Li Yunjuan as Pipa Lady
 Wang Delin as Immortal Ruyi
 Xu Guanchun as Sun Rooster of Hairy Head
 Wang Fengxia as Princess Iron Fan
 Zheng Yiping as Jade Faced Vixen
 Ji You as Earth deity
 Zhang Qing as Princess of Jisai

 Zhao Baocai as Dragon King
 Jin Gang as King of Jisai
 Li Fengchun as Old monk
 Li Zhiyi as Old abbot
 Tian Jiangshui, Bai Jiancai and Gao Jifeng as Monks
 Li Jiancheng as Benbo'erba
 Gao Baozhong as Babo'erben
 Ma Dehua, Yu Hong as Ambassadors
 Cao Duo as Yellow Brows Great King
 Wang Linghua as Almond Immortal (Apricot Fairy)
 Tie Niu as Maitreya
 Cao Duo as Guzhi Gong
 Ye Bing as Jinjie Shiba Gong
 Li Tiefeng as Fuyun Sou
 Ye Yimeng as Lingkongzi
 Tie Niu as Kangua Laoren
 Li Jinshui as Ghost messenger
 Gong Ming as King of Zhuzi
 Zhan Pingping as Lady of Jinsheng Palace
 Wang Ren as Tai Sui Equivalent
 Zhou Caili as Youlai Youqu
 Shi Chongren as Old eunuch
 Han Tao as Immortal Ziyang
 Ni Fuquan as Physician
 Li Jianliang as Minister
 Yao Jia as First Spider Demoness
 Liu Qian as Second Spider Demoness
 Du Xianghui as Third Spider Demoness
 Yang Su as Fourth Spider Demoness
 Azhi Shima as Fifth Spider Demoness
 Lü Haiyu as Sixth Spider Demoness
 Liu Lin as Seventh Spider Demoness
 Li Hongchang as Hundred Eyed Demon Lord
 Yang Qimin as Pilanpo Bodhisattva
 Li Enqi as Lishan Laomu incarnation
 Yang Bin as Priest
 Chang Qing as Albino rat
 Wang Jie and Li Zhixiong as Monks
 Wu Tang as Supervisor
 Yu Xuemei and Jiang Xiuhua as Demon girls
 Nige Mutu as King of Yuhua
 Zhang Yang as First Prince of Yuhua
 Ye Yimeng as Second Prince of Yuhua 
 Yang Bin as Third Prince of Yuhua
 Gong Ming as Wang Xiao'er
 Qu Yinglian as Wang Xiao'er's wife
 Chen Qingping as Zhao's mother
 Yang Yumin as Queen
 Xiang Han as Tawny Lion Demon
 Li Jiancheng as Nine Headed Lion
 Sha Jie as Diaozhuan Guguai
 He Yi as Guguai Diaozhuan
 Zhu Bingqian as Taiyi Zhenren
 Xiang Han and Li Hongchang as Merchants
 Li Lingyu as Jade Rabbit
 Wang Tong as King of India
 Ren Fengpo as Old monk
 Yu Hong as Queen of India
 Wang Xizhong as Golden Peak Immortal
 Li Hongchang as Boatman
 He Chengfu as Long Brows Arhat
 Li Yang as Dapeng Zunzhe

Season 2

Main cast
Liu Xiao Ling Tong as Sun Wukong
Xu Shaohua, Chi Chongrui as Tang Sanzang
Cui Jingfu as Zhu Bajie
Liu Dagang as Sha Wujing

Other cast
Listed in order of appearance

 Zhang Zhiming as Emperor Taizong of Tang
 Zheng Rong as Taishang Laojun
 Liu Jiang as King Yama
 Zhu Longguang as Buddha
 Wang Zhongxin as Taibai Jinxing
 Zhang Wankun as Chen Qing
 Zhang Wenhui as Chen Qing's wife
 Li Qingyou as Housekeeper
 Liu Lifeng as Xiaoguanbao
 Hou Lei as Yipengjin
 Wang Limin as King of Spiritual Touch
 Ji Yu as Fish Woman
 Lan Faqing as Great White Turtle
 Zhang Fen as Muzha
 Zhang Ziqiang as Old man
 Zhang Xueqin as Old man's wife
 Guan Xiaoyu as Old man's son
 Yang Xingyi as Old man's daughter-in-law
 Jiang Baohong as Chief robber
 Liu Xiao Ling Tong as Six Eared Macaque
 Jiang Hongbao as Horse Monkey
 Wang Weiguo as Jade Emperor
 Cui Jingfu, Wu Zhiyong as Dragon King of the East Sea
 Liu Dagang as Diting
 Jia Shitou as Azure Lion King
 Wang Weiguo as Yellow Toothed Elephant
 Guo Jun as Golden Winged Great Peng
 Jin Qiaoqiao as peacock princess
 Lan Jiafu as Xiaozhuanfeng
 Zhu Dan as Xique

 Liu Dagang as Dragon King of the North Sea
 An Yaping as Water Dragon
 Yang Jing as Princess of Black River
 Cao Rong as Crown Prince Mo'ang
 Li Hongtao as Dragon King of Jing River
 Zhou Zheng as Yuan Shoucheng
 Chi Guodong as Dragon King of the West Sea
 Li Hongchang as Fisherman
 Ge Zhixing as Deity of Black River
 Ni Fuquan as Earth Deity of Mount Golden Bull
 Li Hongtao as Rhinoceros King
 Chen Zhongsheng as Li Jing
 Zhu Qin, Wang Wei as Nezha
 Ding Jian as Fire Star
 Ma Yongzeng as Water Star
 Wang Hui, Zhang Wei, Zhao Shunzeng and Sun Jifeng as Four Heavenly Masters
 Wen Xiang as Servant boy
 Tan Feiling as Marquis of Fengxian
 Ni Fuquan as Earth Deity of Fengxian
 Jin Liuyi as Old man from Fengxian
 Di Yuerong as Wife of Marquis of Fengxian
 Wu Suying as Village woman from Fengxian
 Xue Yongliang as Man from Fengxian
 Sha Lin as Wind Deity
 Zhang Dandan as Lightning Deity
 Yang Zichun as Old man Li
 Xue Chunyu as Old man Li's wife
 Zhang Pingsheng as Old man Li's son
 Bo Hong as Red Scaled Python
 Zheng Ying as Woodcutter's wife

 Wu Zhiyong as Leopard Demon
 Lan Faqing as Wolf Demon
 Yu Wanling as Old woman
 Li Hongchang as Official from the Kingdom of Biqiu
 Wang Ying as King of Biqiu
 Yu Meng as Vixen spirit
 Liu Jin as Deer Spirit
 Qiu Yongli as Evil priest
 Xu Jiansheng as Guard from the Kingdom of Biqiu
 Cai Guangqing as Squire Kou
 Wang Meihong as Second Madam
 Wang Xia as Zhu Liya
 Shu Xin as Wosi
 Chen Jian as Housekeeper
 Zhang Kunwu as Hui'er
 Huang Zongluo as Official of Tongtai
 Li Xiaobo as Civil official
 Zhong Changde as Abbot of Jinping
 Chen Dazhong as King of Cold Protection
 Zhao Yi as King of Heat Protection
 Cai Yuge as King of Dust Protection
 Liu Dan as Dragon Girl of the West Sea
 Lan Faqing as Wood Dragon of Horn
 Jiang Baohong as Wood Insect of Dipper
 Xu Jiansheng as Wood Wolf of Legs
 Li Canwen as Wood Dog of Well

Music
The music for the series was mainly composed by Xu Jingqing (许镜清).

Season 1

Season 2

Accolades

Wu Cheng'en and Journey to the West

The original lead actors of Journey to the West (1986) — Liu Xiao Ling Tong, Chi Chongrui and Ma Dehua — reprised their roles in Wu Cheng'en and Journey to the West, a 2010 television series about Wu Cheng'en and his inspiration for writing the novel Journey to the West. Sha Wujing, however, was portrayed by Liu Dagang because Yan Huaili, who played the character in 1986, died in April 2009.

See also
 List of media adaptations of Journey to the West

References

External links
 

Television shows based on Journey to the West
1986 Chinese television series debuts
1999 Chinese television series endings
Television about fairies and sprites
Demons in television
1980s Chinese television series
1990s Chinese television series
Mandarin-language television shows